Paurophleps is a genus of moths in the subfamily Arctiinae. It was described by George Hampson in 1900.

Species
Paurophleps minuta Hampson, 1900
Paurophleps reducta (Janse, 1964)

References

Lithosiini
Moth genera